Lady Killer is a 1937 French drama film directed by Jean Grémillon and starring Jean Gabin, Mireille Balin and Marguerite Deval. It has been classified as both a film noir  and an entry into the poetic realist group of films of the late 1930s.  It was produced by the German company UFA in conjunction with its own French subsidiary ACE. Like Port of Shadows it drew on the tradition of German expressionism in its lighting and set design, although the Nazi authorities were opposed to the expressionist style.

It was shot at the Babelsberg Studios in Berlin and on location around Cannes, Orange and Paris. The film's sets were designed by the art directors Hermann Asmus and Max Mellin. The film was selected for screening as part of the Cannes Classics section at the 2016 Cannes Film Festival.

Cast
Jean Gabin as Lucien Bourrache, 'Gueule d'Amour'
Mireille Balin as Madeleine
Pierre Etchepare as hotel owner
Henri Poupon as Monsieur Cailloux
 as Le valet de chambre
Pierre Magnier as Commandant
Marguerite Deval as Madame Courtois
René Lefèvre as René
Jane Marken as Madame Cailloux (as Jeanne Marken)
Paulette Noizeux
 as restaurant manager (as Siméon)
Pierre Labry as printer
 as client
Louis Florencie as waiter (as Florencie)
Paul Fournier as client
 as Captain
Maurice Baquet as the sick soldier
Frédéric Mariotti as Le cantonnier (as Mariotti)

References

Bibliography
 Driskell, Jonathan . The French Screen Goddess: Film Stardom and the Modern Woman in 1930s France. I.B.Tauris, 2015.
 Spicer, Andrew (ed.) European Film Noir. Manchester University Press, 2019.
Walker-Morrison, Deborah. Classic French Noir: Gender and the Cinema of Fatal Desire. Bloomsbury Publishing, 2020.
 Williams, Alan Larson. Republic of Images: A History of French Filmmaking. Harvard University Press, 1992.

External links

1937 films
1937 drama films
French drama films
French black-and-white films
Films set in Cannes
Films directed by Jean Grémillon
1930s French-language films
Films shot in Paris
Films shot at Babelsberg Studios
UFA GmbH films
1930s French films